This is a list of gold mines in Tanzania. It includes all working, former and future mines that produce gold as a primary or by-product. It is organized in alphabetic order.

B
Bulyanhulu Gold Mine
Buzwagi Gold Mine

G
Geita Gold Mine
Golden Pride Gold Mine

H
Handeni mine

K
Kirondatal Gold Mine

M
Mbangala Gold Mine

N
New Luika Gold Mine
North Mara Gold Mine
Nyanzaga mine

Sogwe
Sekenke Gold Mine

T
Tulawaka Gold Mine

Tanzania
Gold mines